Jessica Chávez Valencia (born 15 July 1988) is a Mexican professional boxer. She is a former world champion in two weight classes, having held the IBF female light flyweight title from 2011 to 2013 and the WBC female flyweight title from 2015 to 2017. She also challenged for the WBC female light flyweight title in 2014 and the WBC female super flyweight title in 2019. As of September 2020, she is ranked as the world's second best active female super flyweight by The Ring and third by BoxRec.

Professional career
Chávez made her professional debut on 12 June 2006, scoring a fourth-round technical knockout (TKO) victory against Maribel Cruz in Cancún, Mexico.

After compiling a record of 5–0–2 (1 KO), she suffered her first defeat, losing by points decision (PTS) over six rounds against Ibeth Zamora Silva on 7 June 2008 in Toluca, Mexico. She came back from defeat with a four-round PTS win against Magdalena Leija in November, before challenging Yésica Bopp for the WBA interim female light flyweight title on 7 March 2009 at the Gimnasio Municipal No. 1 in Puerto Madryn, Argentina. Chávez suffered her second defeat, losing by a shutout unanimous decision (UD) over ten rounds, with all three judges scoring the bout 100–90.

Following the defeat to Bopp she secured three wins, one by knockout (KO), before defeating Susana Cruz Pérez via split decision (SD) to capture the vacant WBC-NABF female light flyweight title on 2 October 2010 at the Coliseo Olimpico de la UG in Guadalajara, Mexico. She next fought Esmeralda Moreno for the Mexican interim, and WBC Silver female light flyweight titles on 19 February 2011 at the Deportivo Trabajadores del Metro in Iztacalco, Mexico. Chávez lost the bout by UD, with all three judges scoring it 98–92.

In her next fight she challenged IBF female light flyweight champion, Irma Sánchez, on 16 April 2011 at the World Trade Center in Boco del Río, Mexico. Chávez defeated Sánchez via SD to capture her first world title, with two judges scoring the bout 99–91 and 97–93 in favour of Chávez while the third scored it 96–95 to Sánchez. She successfully defended the title three times, winning two by stoppage, followed by a UD victory against Linda Soto in a non-title fight in July 2011 before losing the title outside of the ring in September (stripped or vacated).

In her next fight she defeated former world title challenger, Kanittha Kokietgym, via shutout UD to capture the lightly regarded vacant WBF interim female light flyweight title on 10 November 2012 at the Estadio Morelos in Ecatepec, Mexico. All three judges scored the bout 100–90 in favour of Chávez.

She next faced Irma Sánchez in a rematch on 23 February 2013 at the Centro de Convenciones in Ixtapa, Mexico, with the vacant WBC Silver female light flyweight title on the line. Chávez defeated Sánchez for a second time, this time by UD with two judges scoring the bout 98–92 and the third scored it 99–91. Her first defence of the title came against former foe and reigning WBA and WBO female light flyweight champion, Yésica Bopp, on 1 June at the Centro Civico in Ecatepec. Bopp's WBA and WBO titles were not at stake, only Chávez' WBC Silver title. Chávez gained revenge over Bopp, making the score 1–1 with a UD victory. Two judges scored the bout 97–93 and the third scored it 96–95. Chávez scored a ten-round UD win in a non-title fight against former world champion Tenkai Tsunami in July, before making the second defence of her WBC Silver title against former world champion Arely Muciño in November, retaining the title through a split draw.

She moved up to flyweight following the draw to Muciño, scoring a UD victory in a rematch with Tsunami in April 2014 before defeating former world champion, Melissa McMorrow, by UD to capture the WBC International flyweight title on 23 August at the Convention Center Surman Villa de las Flores in Coacalco, Mexico, with the judges' scorecards reading 97–93, 97–94 and 96–94.

She moved back down to light flyweight to challenged the WBC champion, Ibeth Zamora Silva, on 22 November at the Plaza de los Martíres in Toluca. Chávez failed in her attempt at a second light flyweight world title, losing by UD, with all three judges scoring the bout 98–92.

Following defeat to Silva she moved back up to flyweight, defeating Norj Guro by UD in April 2015 and Maria Magdalena Rivera by UD in June to capture the vacant WBC International title for a second time, before challenging newly crowned WBC female flyweight champion, Arely Muciño, in a rematch on 19 September at the Emiliano Zapata Sports Center in Ecatepec. Chávez captured her second world title, becoming a two-weight world champion via UD. The judges' scorecards read 99–91 and 98–92 twice. She went on to successfully defend the title six times, scoring wins over former world champions Simona Galassi, Naoko Fujioka and Esmeralda Moreno twice.

She moved up to super flyweight for her next fight, challenging WBC champion Guadalupe Martínez Guzmán on 27 April 2019 at the Centro Regional de Deporte de Las Américas in Ecatepec. Chávez failed in her attempt at becoming a three-weight world champion, losing by SD. One judge scored the bout 96–94 in favour of Chávez while the other two scored it 97–93 and 96–94 in favour of Guzmán.

Professional boxing record

References

Living people
1988 births
Mexican women boxers
Boxers from Mexico City
Light-flyweight boxers
Flyweight boxers
Super-flyweight boxers
International Boxing Federation champions
World Boxing Council champions